Tmesipteris tannensis is a fern ally endemic to New Zealand. It is usually epiphytic on trees and tree ferns, but is occasionally terrestrial.

An example of occurrence of T. tannensis within a tiered phytocoenosis is in Central Westland of South Island, New Zealand. These forests are the most extensive continuous podocarp/broadleaf forests in New Zealand. The overstory includes miro, rimu and mountain totara. The mid-story includes tree ferns such as Cyathea smithii and Dicksonia squarrosa, whilst the lowest tier and epiphytic associates include Asplenium polyodon, Astelia solandri and Blechnum discolor along with T. tannensis.

References

Sources
 
 C. Michael Hogan. 2009. Crown Fern: Blechnum discolor, Globaltwitcher.com, ed. N. Stromberg

Psilotaceae
Ferns of New Zealand
Epiphytes